The North-West Frontier Province (NWFP;) was a Chief Commissioner's Province of British India, established on 9 November 1901 from the north-western districts of the Punjab Province. Following the referendum in 1947 to join either Pakistan or India, the province voted hugely in favour of joining Pakistan and it acceded accordingly on 14th August, 1947. It was dissolved to form a unified province of West Pakistan in 1955 upon creation of One Unit Scheme and was re-established in 1970. It was known by this name until 19 April 2010, when it was redesignated as the province of Khyber Pakhtunkhwa following the passing of the Eighteenth Amendment to the Constitution of Pakistan by erstwhile President Asif Ali Zardari.

Its capital was the city of Peshawar, and the province was composed of six divisions (Bannu, Dera Ismail Khan, Hazara, Kohat, Mardan, and Peshawar Division; Malakand was later added as the seventh division). Until 1947, the province was bordered by five princely states to the north, the minor states of the Gilgit Agency to the northeast, the province of West Punjab to the east and the province of Balochistan to the south. The Kingdom of Afghanistan lay to the northwest, with the Federally Administered Tribal Areas forming a buffer zone between the two.

History

Formation
The northwestern frontier areas were annexed by the East India Company after the Second Sikh War (1848–49). The territories thenceforth formed a part of Punjab until the province, then known as North-West Frontier Province, was created in 1901 from the north-western districts of the Punjab Province.
This region, along with the 'Frontier Tribal Areas', acted as a buffer zone with Afghanistan.

Inside Pakistan
Before the Partition of India, the 1947 North-West Frontier Province referendum was held in July 1947 to decide the future of NWFP, in which the people of the province decided in favor of joining Pakistan. However, the then Chief Minister Dr Khan Sahib, along with his brother Bacha Khan and the Khudai Khidmatgars, boycotted the referendum, citing that it did not have the options of the NWFP becoming independent or joining Afghanistan.

As a separate province, the NWFP lasted until 1955 when it was merged into the new province of West Pakistan, under the One Unit policy announced by Prime Minister Chaudhry Mohammad Ali. It was recreated after the dissolution of the One Unit system and lasted under its old nomenclature until April 2010, when it was renamed as the 'Khyber Pakhtunkhwa' province.

Government 
The offices of Governor and Chief Minister of the North-West Frontier Province lasted until 14 October 1955.

Demographics 

Historical population, language, and religious counts in North-West Frontier Province were enumerated in all districts (Hazara, Mardan, Peshawar, Kohat, Bannu, and Dera Ismail Khan), detailed in the population, language, and religious tables above and below. Separate population counts were taken in the Agencies and Tribal Areas, as detailed on the respective article page.

At independence, there was a clear Muslim Pashtun and Hindkowan majority in the North-West Frontier Province, although there were also significant Hindu and Sikh Pashtun, Hindkowan and Punjabi minorities scattered across the province.

Language 
The languages of the North-West Frontier Province included Pashto, Hindko, Kohistani and others, although most of the population spoke either Pashto or Lahnda/Western Punjabi (primarily Hindko and Saraiki). Prior to the arrival of the British, the official language, for governmental uses and such, was Persian.

Districts

Religion 

Religious counts below is for the entirety of NWFP (Hazara, Mardan, Peshawar, Kohat, Bannu, and Dera Ismail Khan). The Agencies and Tribal Areas constituted a separate administrative division where religious composition was not enumerated, except at small Trans-Frontier Posts in the region.

Adherents of Islam who were indigenous to frontier regions that continued to have relatively large Hindu populations, and who were also relatively recent converts, were influenced by some traditions of Hinduism; in contrast, Muslims in frontier regions that had been further influenced by orthodox Islam and converted at a much earlier date were noted in their relatively different cultural habits.

Similarly, adherents of Hinduism who belonged to the various castes and tribes who were indigenous to the frontier regions had considerable Islamic influence, owing to their status as a religious minority in the region for centuries, and thus formed religious syncretism that incorporated aspects from both faiths into their cultures and traditions. 

Lastly, decadal census reports throughout the colonial era frequently detailed the difficulty of differentiating adherents of Hinduism with adherents of Sikhism, owing to the traditional ability of the former in assimilating and integrating followers of varied thought into Hinduism.

Districts 
With rapid population growth occurring across all districts in the province, Mardan District was added to the North–West Frontier Province in 1941.

Tehsils

Cities

Castes and tribes

See also
 Frontier Regions
 Federally Administered Tribal Areas
 Eighteenth Amendment to the Constitution of Pakistan

Notes

References

References
 The Imperial Gazetteer of India (26 vol, 1908–31), a highly detailed description of all of India in 1901. online edition

External links
 Government of Khyber Pakhtunkhwa

 
Provinces of British India
Former subdivisions of Pakistan
History of Khyber Pakhtunkhwa
1901 establishments in British India
2010 disestablishments in Pakistan